Paola Ramos Xdona  (born ) is a retired Peruvian female volleyball player.

She was part of the Peru women's national volleyball team at the 1996 Summer Olympics.
On club level she played with Power Divino Maest.

Clubs
 Power Divino Maest (1994)

References

External links
Paola Ramos at Sports Reference

1975 births
Living people
Peruvian women's volleyball players
Place of birth missing (living people)
Volleyball players at the 1996 Summer Olympics
Olympic volleyball players of Peru
20th-century Peruvian women